1992 was the first season Russia held its own national football competition since the breakup of the Soviet Union.

Club competitions
The teams participating came mostly from the Soviet Union leagues. New Top League had 20 teams, second-level First League had 3 zones and 52 teams in total and third-level Second League had 6 zones with 115 teams. FC Spartak Moscow won the championship.

For more details, see:
1992 Russian Top League
1992 Russian First League
1992 Russian Second League

Cup competitions
The last, 1991/92 edition of the Soviet Cup was won by FC Spartak Moscow who beat PFC CSKA Moscow in the final game 2–0 on 10 May 1992. Ukrainian teams who were scheduled to play in the quarterfinals, FC Dynamo Kyiv, FC Metalist Kharkiv and FC Chornomorets Odesa all withdrew, giving Spartak, CSKA and FC Pamir Dushanbe spots in the semifinals.

The early stages of the 1992–93 Russian Cup were played later in the year.

European club competitions
All the Russian teams participating in the 1991–92 seasons of their respective competitions were eliminated in 1991.

The Russian league was not finished by the time of the 1992–93 season, therefore the Russian teams qualified for that season based on the Soviet Top League 1991 results.

1992–93 UEFA Champions League
PFC CSKA Moscow, surprisingly, qualified for the group stage, unexpectedly knocking out FC Barcelona in the qualification round. They came last in their group though, only gaining 2 points in 6 games. They could not play their home games in Moscow due to the lack of a stadium meeting the Champions League standards at the time.

 16 September 1992 / first round, first leg / Víkingur (Iceland) – PFC CSKA Moscow 0–1 (Karsakov ) / Reykjavík, Laugardalsvöllur / attendance: 2,000
PFC CSKA Moscow: Kharine, Guschin (Bavykin, 70), Kolotovkin, Bystrov, Fokin (captain), Ivanov, Mashkarin, Grishin, Sergeyev, Bushmanov (Karsakov, 57), Faizulin.

 30 September 1992 / first round, return leg / PFC CSKA Moscow – Víkingur 4–2 (Sergeyev  Karsakov  Grishin  Kolesnikov  – Einarrson  Steinsson ) / Moscow, Luzhniki Stadium / attendance: 10,000
PFC CSKA Moscow: Kharine, Guschin (Mashkarin, 69), Malyukov, Bystrov, Fokin (captain), Ivanov, Minko, Grishin, Sergeyev, Karsakov, Faizulin (Kolesnikov, 61).

 21 October 1992 / second round, first leg / PFC CSKA Moscow – FC Barcelona (Spain) 1–1 (Grishin  – Txiki Begiristain ) / Moscow, Luzhniki Stadium / attendance: 40,000
PFC CSKA Moscow: Kharine, Guschin, Kolotovkin, Bystrov, Fokin (captain), Ivanov, Mashkarin (Bushmanov, 68), Grishin, Sergeyev, Karsakov (Faizulin, 63), Minko.

 4 November 1992 / second round, return leg / FC Barcelona – PFC CSKA Moscow 2–3 (Nadal  Txiki Begiristain  – Bushmanov  Mashkarin  Karsakov ) / Barcelona, Camp Nou / attendance: 80,000
PFC CSKA Moscow: Kharine, Guschin, Kolotovkin, Malyukov, Fokin, Kolesnikov (captain) (Ivanov, 75), Mashkarin, Grishin (Karsakov, 38), Sergeyev, Bushmanov, Faizulin.

 25 November 1992 / Group A, Day 1 / Club Brugge (Belgium) – PFC CSKA Moscow 1–0 (Amokachi ) / Bruges, Olympiastadion / attendance: 24,000
PFC CSKA Moscow: Kharine (Guteyev, 46), Guschin, Kolotovkin, Bystrov, Malyukov, Kolesnikov (captain), Mashkarin, Grishin (Karsakov, 30), Sergeyev, Bushmanov, Faizulin.

 4 December 1992 / Group A, Day 2 / PFC CSKA Moscow – Rangers (Scotland) 0–1 (Ferguson ) / Bochum, Germany, Ruhrstadion / attendance: 16,000
PFC CSKA Moscow: Guteyev, Guschin (Ivanov, 68), Kolotovkin, Bystrov, Fokin (captain), Malyukov, Valeri Minko (Grishin, 61), Karsakov, Sergeyev, Bushmanov, Faizulin.

1992–93 European Cup Winners' Cup
Despite stumbling in the first game against the low-rated FC Avenir Beggen, FC Spartak Moscow had quite a successful run, eventually reaching the semifinals.

 16 September 1992 / first round, first leg / FC Spartak Moscow – FC Avenir Beggen (Luxembourg) 0–0 / Moscow, Luzhniki Stadium / attendance: 12,500
FC Spartak Moscow: Cherchesov (captain), Khlestov, Ivanov (Beschastnykh, 50), Rusyayev, Chernyshov, Onopko, Karpin, Piatnitski, Lediakhov, Radchenko.

 30 September 1992 / first round, return leg / FC Avenir Beggen – FC Spartak Moscow 1–5 (Nowak  – Onopko  Piatnitski   Radchenko  Popov ) / Beggen, Stade rue Henri Dunant / attendance: 1,604.
FC Spartak Moscow: Cherchesov (captain), Khlestov, Ivanov (Kuzhlev, 74), Popov, Rusyayev (Beschastnykh, 26), Chernyshov, Onopko, Karpin, Piatnitski, Lediakhov, Radchenko.

 22 October 1992 / second round, first leg / FC Spartak Moscow – Liverpool F.C. (England) 4–2 (Pisarev  Karpin   Piatnitski  – Wright  McManaman  Grobbelaar ) / Moscow, Luzhniki Stadium / attendance: 60,000
FC Spartak Moscow: Cherchesov (captain), Khlestov, Ivanov, Pisarev, Beschastnykh (Rusyayev, 53), Chernyshov, Onopko, Karpin, Piatnitski, Lediakhov, Radchenko.

 4 November 1992 / second round, return leg / Liverpool F.C. – FC Spartak Moscow 0–2 (Radchenko  Piatnitski  – Marsh ) / Liverpool, Anfield / attendance: 38,000
FC Spartak Moscow: Cherchesov (captain), Khlestov, Ivanov, Pisarev (Rusyayev, 64), Beschastnykh, Chernyshov, Onopko, Karpin, Piatnitski, Lediakhov (Baksheyev, 85), Radchenko.

1992–93 UEFA Cup
Both FC Dynamo Moscow and FC Torpedo Moscow had impressive wins, beating Torino F.C. and Manchester United F.C. respectively, before being eliminated.

 16 September 1992 / first round, first leg / FC Dynamo Moscow – Rosenborg BK (Norway) 5–1 (Sklyarov   Timofeev  Simutenkov  Tetradze  – Løken ) / Moscow, Dynamo Stadium / attendance: 6,500
FC Dynamo Moscow: Kleimyonov, Timofeev, Sklyarov (captain), Tskhadadze, Kalitvintsev (Spanderashvili, 88), Hovhannisyan, Smertin (Drozdov, 71), Tsaryov, Tetradze, Gasimov, Simutenkov.

 16 September 1992 / first round, first leg / Manchester United F.C. (England) – FC Torpedo Moscow 0–0 / Manchester, Old Trafford / attendance: 20,000
FC Torpedo Moscow: Podshivalov (captain), Filimonov, Cheltsov, Afanasyev, Vostrosablin, Shustikov (Skachenko, 80), Grishin, Martynov, Talalayev (Ulyanov, 75), Chugainov, Arefyev.

 29 September 1992 / first round, return leg / FC Torpedo Moscow – Manchester United F.C. 0–0; 4–3 in shootout (Chugainov  Grishin  Ulyanov  Arefyev  Afanasyev  Borisov  – Ince  Irwin  Robson  Pallister  McClair  Bruce ) / Moscow, Torpedo Stadium / attendance: 11,350
FC Torpedo Moscow: Podshivalov (captain), Filimonov, Cheltsov, Afanasyev, Vostrosablin (Borisov, 100), Shustikov, Grishin, Talalayev, Arefyev, Chugainov, Pazemov (Ulyanov, 84).

 30 September 1992 / first round, return leg / Rosenborg BK – FC Dynamo Moscow 2–0 (Ingebrigtsen  Løken ) / Trondheim, Lerkendal stadion / attendance: 10,218
FC Dynamo Moscow: Kleimyonov, Tsaryov, Sklyarov, Tskhadadze, Kalitvintsev, Kobelev (captain), Smertin, Derkach, Hovhannisyan, Gasimov (Spanderashvili, 88), Simutenkov (Drozdov, 70).

 21 October 1992 / second round, first leg / Real Madrid C.F. (Spain) – FC Torpedo Moscow 5–2 (Hierro    Zamorano  Prosinečki  – Shustikov  Grishin ) / Madrid, Santiago Bernabéu Stadium / attendance: 50,000
FC Torpedo Moscow: Podshivalov (captain), Filimonov, Cheltsov, Afanasyev, Ulyanov, Shustikov, Grishin, Tishkov, Vostrosablin (Savichev, 46), Chugainov, Arefyev.

 22 October 1992 / second round, first leg / Torino F.C. (Italy) – FC Dynamo Moscow 1–2 (Timofeev  – Gasimov  Simutenkov ) / Turin, Stadio delle Alpi / attendance: 26,943
FC Dynamo Moscow: Kleimyonov, Timofeev, Sklyarov (Varlamov, 84), Tskhadadze, Tsaryov, Kobelev (captain), Smertin, Derkach, Tetradze, Gasimov (Hovhannisyan, 88), Simutenkov.

 4 November 1992 / second round, return leg / FC Torpedo Moscow – Real Madrid C.F. 3–2 (Talalayev  Tishkov  Murashov  – Zamorano  Hierro  Sanchís ) / Moscow, Torpedo Stadium / attendance: 6,500
FC Torpedo Moscow: Podshivalov (captain), Filimonov, Cheltsov, Afanasyev, Murashov, Shustikov, Grishin, Tishkov, Talalayev (Pazemov, 80), Chugainov, Arefyev (Ulyanov, 73).

 5 November 1992 / second round, return leg / FC Dynamo Moscow – Torino F.C. 0–0 (Simutenkov  – Annoni ) / Moscow, Dynamo Stadium / attendance: 13,000
FC Dynamo Moscow: Kleimyonov, Timofeev, Sklyarov, Tskhadadze, Kalitvintsev (Tsaryov, 66), Kobelev (captain), Varlamov, Derkach, Tetradze, Gasimov (Hovhannisyan, 87), Simutenkov.

 25 November 1992 / third round, first leg / FC Dynamo Moscow – S.L. Benfica (Portugal) 2–2 (Kalitvintsev  Derkach  – Isaías  ) / Moscow, Torpedo Stadium / attendance: 8,700
FC Dynamo Moscow: Kleimyonov, Hovhannisyan (Kovardayev, 55), Sklyarov, Tskhadadze, Kalitvintsev, Kobelev (captain), Smertin (Savchenko, 84), Derkach, Tetradze, Gasimov, Varlamov.

 8 December 1992 / third round, return leg / S.L. Benfica – FC Dynamo Moscow 2–0 (Isaías  Yuran ) / Lisbon, Estádio da Luz / attendance: 67,000
FC Dynamo Moscow: Kleimyonov, Timofeev, Sklyarov, Tskhadadze, Kalitvintsev, Kobelev (captain) (Varlamov, 69), Smertin (Savchenko, 75), Derkach, Tetradze, Gasimov, Tsaryov.

National team
Soviet Union has qualified for the UEFA Euro 1992. Because the country was dissolved by the time of the competition, a unified team called CIS national football team participated in that tournament. That team played 10 games, with many players representing Russia.

On 16 August 1992, the Russia national football team played its first game in a friendly against Mexico. The head coach was Pavel Sadyrin.

Matches
 16 August 1992 / friendly / Russia – Mexico 2–0 (Karpin  Popov ) / Moscow, Lokomotiv Stadium / attendance: 15,000
Russia: Cherchesov (captain), Khlestov, Kulkov (Beschastnykh, 63), Popov, Kolotovkin (Chernyshov, 85), Onopko, Tetradze (Podpaly, 85), Karpin, Lediakhov (Kobelev, 46; Ivanov, 76), Matveyev (Lemish, 80), Radchenko.

 14 October 1992 / 1994 FIFA World Cup qualifier / Russia – Iceland 1–0 (Yuran ) / Moscow, Luzhniki Stadium / attendance: 25,000
Russia: Cherchesov (captain), Khlestov, Kulkov, Onopko, Kolotovkin, Shalimov, Dobrovolski, Karpin, Lediakhov (Tatarchuk, 46), Yuran (Kolyvanov, 77), Kiriakov.

 28 October 1992 / 1994 FIFA World Cup qualifier / Russia – Luxembourg 2–0 (Yuran  Radchenko ) / Moscow, Luzhniki Stadium / attendance: 3,000
Russia: Cherchesov (captain), Khlestov, Kulkov, Onopko, Mostovoi, Shalimov, Dobrovolski, Karpin, Radchenko (Tatarchuk, 79), Yuran, Kiriakov (Borodyuk, 60).

References

External links
Overview of the whole Russian championship including the First League

 
Seasons in Russian football